Floing may refer to the following places:

Floing, Ardennes, in Ardennes, France
Floing, Austria, in Styria, Austria